Vladimir Bîrsa (born 22 April 1972) is a Moldovan male weightlifter, competing in the 77 kg category and representing Moldova at international competitions. He participated at the 1996 Summer Olympics in the 76 kg event. He competed at world championships, most recently at the 2003 World Weightlifting Championships. Until February 2010, he held the national Snatch record in Moldova, when Alexandru Dudoglo beat his record.

Major results

References

External links
 

1972 births
Living people
Moldovan male weightlifters
Weightlifters at the 1996 Summer Olympics
Olympic weightlifters of Moldova
Place of birth missing (living people)